Gertude Alice Ram was the first female major general of the Indian Army.

She was appointed as director of the Military Nursing Services on 27 August 1976.

She died in Mussoorie in April 2002.

References

2002 deaths
Female generals of the Indian Army
Year of birth missing
Female army generals
Indian female military personnel
Indian Army personnel